Yvel may refer to:

 Gilbert Yvel (born 1976), Dutch martial artist
 Yvel (river), French river
 YVEL, Israeli company
 Yveltal, Legendary Pokémon